Shelby is an unincorporated community in north central Linn County, in the U.S. state of Missouri. The community is on Missouri Route V approximately 7.5 miles east of Purdin.

History
A post office called Shelby was established in 1882, and remained in operation until 1904. The community was named after Sheldon "Shelby" Wilson, a local merchant.

References

Unincorporated communities in Linn County, Missouri
Unincorporated communities in Missouri